The Soko J-21 Jastreb, referred to as the J-1 Jastreb in some sources, is a Yugoslav single-seat, single-engine, light attack aircraft, designed by the Aeronautical Technical Institute (ATI) and Vojnotehnički Institut Beograd (VTI), in Belgrade and manufactured by SOKO in Mostar. Derived from the G-2 Galeb advanced jet trainer and light attack aircraft, it was designed in single-seat ground-attack and two-seat advanced flying / weapon training versions.

Design and development
The J-21 Jastreb was developed as a replacement for the Republic F-84 Thunderjet, which had been the most commonly used turbojet fighter-bomber aircraft of the Yugoslav Air Force until 1967. On the basis of the G-2 Galeb, the J-21 Jastreb was developed as a single seat ground attack variant, flying for the first time on 19 July 1965.

Pilots sit on licence-built Folland Type 1-B ejection seats under individual canopies hinged on the starboard side in un-pressurised cockpits. Instruments and controls are entirely conventional with manually operated flying controls and standard flight instruments.

Powered by a single BWB licence-built Rolls-Royce Viper Mk531 the Jastreb has a conventional aluminium alloy stressed skin structure with few or no special features. The relatively thick aerofoil section, though limiting performance, provides room for fuel cells and the retracted main undercarriage which retracts inwards, giving the Jastreb a wide track and imbuing it with excellent ground handling characteristics. The levered undercarriage legs and relatively low pressure tyres allow the Jastreb to operate from un-prepared strips or rough surfaced airfields.

Compared to the Galeb, the Jastreb has a strengthened structure, allowing more weapons to be carried, including three  Browning AN/M3 machine guns with 135 rpg, mounted in the nose of the aircraft.

Operational history
The J-21 entered service with the JRV (Yugoslavian Air Force) on 31 December 1968, with very few, if any, remaining in service.

First Congo War

According to some reports, France and Yugoslavia supported Mobutu's government during the First Congo War. Namely, Yugoslavia agreed to deliver three J-21 and a single G-2 aircraft, as well as four MiG-21PFMs, while three Mi-24s were purchased from Ukraine. All these aircraft were based at Gbadolite and flown mainly by Serbian mercenaries.

A Yugoslavian pilot, Ratko Turčinović, was killed while flying an ultra-low-level pass over Gbadolite, clipping a lamp post with his wing. The wreckage of his aircraft fell directly into a column of young soldiers on a parade, killing dozens. The accident is reported as being attributed to Turčinović's alcohol dependency.

Soon after the accident, the Yugoslavian staff were expelled from the DRC and the Jastrebs were abandoned along with the Galebs. MiG-21s and Mi-24s, which were awaiting assembly by Russian or Ukrainian technicians at Gbadolite, were also abandoned and can still be seen on the ramp at Gbadolite (2013).

Bosnia and Herzegovina

Six J-21 Jastrebs of the Republika Srpska Air Force were engaged by USAF F-16s during Operation Deny Flight for violating the NATO-enforced no-fly-zone, in what is known as the Banja Luka incident. The USAF claimed 4 J-21s shot down by F-16s, while the Serbs claimed 5 Jastrebs as lost. The discrepancy likely stems from a damaged Jastreb crashing near the airfield after the F-16s had departed.

On November 15, during the Battle of the Dalmatian Channels, at 9:28 a.m. three Yugoslav Air Force J-21 Jastrebs flew low over Brač and Šolta; minutes later, two were reportedly shot down by anti-aircraft artillery. Six Yugoslav jets were sortied against targets on Brač and Šolta.

Variants
J-21 Jastreb Single-seat ground-attack, reconnaissance aircraft.
J-21E Jastreb Export version of the J-1.
RJ-21 Jastreb Single-seat tactical reconnaissance aircraft.
RJ-21E Jastreb Export version of the RJ-1.
NJ-21Two-seat advanced flying trainer / weapons trainer / light ground attack aircraft.

Operators
 Libya
Free Libyan Air Force

Former operators

operated 12 J-21 for training and for ground attack,
 Libyan Jamahiriya
Libyan Air Force

Yugoslav Air Force

Zaire Air Force

Zambia Air Force

Aircraft on display

Serbia
J-21/RJ-21
The original prototype and over 31 J-21s are located at the Museum of Aviation in Belgrade.

Specifications (J-21 Jastreb)

See also

References

J-021 Jastreb
1960s Yugoslav attack aircraft
Military Technical Institute Belgrade
Single-engined jet aircraft
Aircraft first flown in 1965